(Jesus, who hast wrested my soul), 78 is a church cantata of Johann Sebastian Bach. He composed the chorale cantata in Leipzig for the 14th Sunday after Trinity and first performed it on 10 September 1724. It is based on the hymn by Johann Rist.

History and words 

Bach wrote the cantata in his second year in Leipzig, when he composed an annual cycle of chorale cantatas. For the 14th Sunday after Trinity, 10 September 1724, he chose the chorale of Johann Rist (1641) in 12 stanzas. Rist set the words and probably also the melody. An unknown librettist wrote the poetry for seven movements, retaining the first and last stanza and quoting some of the original lines as part of his own writing in the other movements. Movement 2 corresponds to stanza 2 of the chorale, 6 to 11, 3 to 3–5, 4 to 6–7, and 5 to 8–10.

The prescribed readings for the Sunday were from the Epistle to the Galatians, Paul's teaching on "works of the flesh" and "fruit of the Spirit", and from the Gospel of Luke, Cleansing ten lepers. The chorale seems only distantly related, dealing with the Passion of Jesus, which cleanses the believer. The poet refers to sickness and healing in a few lines, more than the chorale does, such as "" (you search for the sick).

Scoring and structure 

The cantata in seven movements is scored for soprano, alto, tenor and bass soloists, a four-part choir, and a Baroque instrumental ensemble of flauto traverso, two oboes, two violins, viola, violone and basso continuo including organ and horn in the opening chorus.

 Chorale: 
 Duet aria (soprano, alto): 
 Recitative (tenor): 
 Aria (tenor, flute): 
 Recitative (bass, strings): 
 Aria (bass, oboe): 
 Chorale:

Music 

The cantata is remarkable for its widely contrasting affects: meditative profundity in the opening chorus, nearly joyful though hesitant bouncing in the second movement, and despair in the third.

The duet for soprano and alto speaks of rushing steps, shown predominantly in the figures of the continuo of celli, violone and organ. 

The tenor recitative begins secco, but ends in an arioso on words of the original chorale. The aria is accompanied by flute motifs to express the relief of the heart.

Bach achieves a dramatic impact, intensified by leaps in the vocal line. The last aria is similar to a concerto for oboe and the bass voice.

The closing chorale sets the original tune in four parts.

Recordings 

 Les Grandes Cantates de J.S. Bach Vol. 7, Fritz Werner, Heinrich-Schütz-Chor Heilbronn, Pforzheim Chamber Orchestra, Marga Höffgen, Helmut Krebs, Franz Kelch, Erato 1960
 Bach Cantatas Vol. 4 – Sundays after Trinity, Karl Richter,  Münchener Bach-Chor, Münchener Bach-Orchester, Ursula Buckel, Hertha Töpper, John van Kesteren, Kieth Engen, Archiv Produktion 1961
 J.S. Bach: Cantatas BWV 78 & BWV 106, Wolfgang Gönnenwein,  Süddeutscher Madrigalchor, Consortium Musicum, Edith Mathis, Sybil Michelow, Theo Altmeyer, Franz Crass, EMI 1965
 Cantatas BWV 172 & BWV 78, Erhard Mauersberger,  Thomanerchor, Gewandhausorchester, Adele Stolte, Annelies Burmeister, Peter Schreier,  Theo Adam, Eterna, 1970
 Bach: Das Kantatenwerk (7), Hermann Max, Dormagener Kantorei,  Barbara Schlick, Hilke Helling, Lutz-Michael Harder, Berthold Possemeyer, FSM Candide late 1975
 Bach: Das Kantatenwerk Vol. 20, Nikolaus Harnoncourt, Tölzer Knabenchor & Concentus Musicus Wien, Wilhelm Wiedl (boy soprano), Paul Esswood, Kurt Equiluz, Ruud van der Meer, Teldec 1977
 J.S. Bach: Cantatas BWV 8, 78 and 99, Julianne Baird, Allan Fast, Frank Kelley, Jan Opalach, The Bach Ensemble, Joshua Rifkin, Florilegium Digital, 1988
 J.S. Bach: Complete Cantatas Vol. 12, Ton Koopman, Amsterdam Baroque Orchestra & Choir,  Lisa Larsson, Annette Markert, Christoph Prégardien, Klaus Mertens, Antoine Marchand 2000
 Bach Cantatas Vol. 7: Ambronay / Bremen, John Eliot Gardiner, Monteverdi Choir, English Baroque Soloists, Malin Hartelius, Robin Tyson, James Gilchrist, Peter Harvey, Soli Deo Gloria 2000
 Bach: Wie schön leuchtet der Morgenstern – Cantata BWV 1, 48, 78 & 140, Karl-Friedrich Beringer, Windsbacher Knabenchor, Deutsche Kammer-Virtuosen Berlin, Sibylla Rubens, Rebecca Martin, Markus Schäfer, Klaus Mertens, Sony Music 2011

References

Sources 

 
 Jesu, der du meine Seele BWV 78; BC A 130 / Chorale cantata (14th Sunday after Trinity) Bach Digital
 Cantata BWV 78 Jesu, der du meine Seele history, scoring, sources for text and music, translations to various languages, discography, discussion, Bach Cantatas Website
 BWV 78 Jesu, der du meine Seele English translation, University of Vermont
 Chapter Chapter 14 BWV 78 Jesu, der du meine Seele / Jesus, who has rent my soul. Julian Mincham, 2010
 BWV 78.7 bach-chorales.com

External links 

 Jesu, der du meine Seele, BWV 78: performance by the Netherlands Bach Society (video and background information)

Church cantatas by Johann Sebastian Bach
1724 compositions
Chorale cantatas